The Georgia National Guard is the National Guard of the U.S. state of Georgia, and consists of the Georgia Army National Guard and the Georgia Air National Guard. (The Georgia State Defense Force is the third military unit of the Georgia Department of Defense, part of the Government of Georgia.)  The Constitution of the United States specifically charges the National Guard with dual federal and state missions. The state functions range from limited actions during non-emergency situations to full scale law enforcement of martial law when local law enforcement officials can no longer maintain civil control.

The National Guard may be called into federal service by the President under either Title 10 or Title 32 status. When National Guard troops are called to federal service, the President serves as Commander-in-Chief. The federal mission assigned to the National Guard is: "To provide properly trained and equipped units for prompt mobilization for war, National emergency or as otherwise needed."

The Governor may call individuals or units of the Georgia National Guard into state service during emergencies or to assist in special situations which lend themselves to use of the National Guard. The state mission assigned to the National Guard is: "To provide trained and disciplined forces for domestic emergencies or as otherwise provided by state law."

As authorized under the Constitution, Congress has the power to regulate National Guard units; hence they are trained and equipped as a part of the United States Army, even when under state command.  The same ranks and insignia are used and National Guardsmen are eligible to receive all United States military awards. All Georgia National Guard soldiers are also eligible for a number of state awards for local services rendered in or to the state of Georgia.

Georgia also maintains its own State Defense Force. This force is separate from the National Guard and reports to the Governor of Georgia as Commander-in-Chief. The GSDF services the state exclusively, especially when the National Guard is deployed and unavailable.

The Georgia National Guard has a State Partnership Program relationship with the Georgian Defence Forces since 1994, and Argentina since 2016.

In 2021, in response to a massive spike in COVID-19 cases, more than 100 National Guard personnel were deployed to 20 hospitals across Georgia.

Army Units

48th Infantry Brigade Combat Team
1st Squadron, 108th Cavalry Regiment, Calhoun
1st Battalion, 121st Infantry Regiment, Winder
2nd Battalion, 121st Infantry Regiment, Forsyth
3d Battalion, 121st Infantry Regiment, Cumming
1st Battalion, 118th Field Artillery Regiment, Savannah
148th Brigade Support Battalion, Macon
177th Brigade Engineer Battalion, Statesboro
78th Aviation Troop Command
1st Battalion (General Support), 171st Aviation Regiment, Dobbins Air Reserve Base, Marietta
Company H, 171st Aviation Regiment, Dobbins Air Reserve Base, Marietta
2d Battalion (Service and Support), 151st Aviation Regiment, Dobbins Air Reserve Base, Marietta
1st Battalion (General Support), 169th Aviation Regiment, Hunter Army Airfield, Savannah
Company C, 1st Battalion (General Support), 111th Aviation Regiment, Dobbins Air Reserve Base, Marietta
1st Battalion (Assault), 185th Aviation Regiment, Winder
935th Combat Service Support Battalion, Hunter Army Airfield, Savannah
Detachment 9, Operational Airlift, Dobbins Air Reserve Base, Marietta
Company C, 2d Battalion (Security and Support), 151st Aviation Regiment, Dobbins Air Reserve Base, Marietta
Army Fixed Wing Support Activity, Robins Air Force Base, Warner Robins
Army Aviation Support Facility No. 1, Winder Barrow Airport, Winder
Army Aviation Support Facility No. 2, Dobbins Air Reserve Base, Marietta
Army Aviation Support Facility No. 3, Hunter Army Airfield, Savannah
648th Maneuver Enhancement Brigade
878th Engineer Battalion, Augusta
348th Brigade Support Battalion, Cumming
1st Battalion, 214th Field Artillery Regiment, Elberton
Joint Task Force 781st CERFP, Kennesaw
78th Troop Command 
122d Regiment (Regional Training Institute), Clay National Guard Center, Marietta
Regional Training Site-Maintenance, Georgia Guard Garrison Training Center, Hinesville
116th Army Band, Joint Forces Headquarters, Ellenwood
124th Mobile Public Affairs Detachment, Clay National Guard Center, Marietta
848th Engineer Company, Douglas
122nd Rear Operations Center, Hinesville
139th Chaplain Detachment, Clay National Guard Center, Marietta
Headquarters Detachment, 265th Regional Support Group, Metter
Headquarters Detachment, 110th Combat Service Support Battalion, Tifton
82d Maintenance Company, Fort Benning, Columbus
1148th Transportation Company, Fort Gordon, Augusta
1230th Transportation Company, Thomasville
277th Maintenance Company, Kennesaw
Georgia Medical Command, Joint Force Headquarters, Ellenwood
Recruiting and Retention Detachment, Joint Forces Headquarters, Ellenwood
North Georgia College and State University Detachment, Dahlonega
Detachment 2, Training Site Support Detachment, Georgia Guard Garrison Training Center, Hinesville
 201st Regional Support Group (Region 4 Homeland Response Force) 
 4th Civil Support Team, Marietta
 170th Military Police Battalion, Decatur
 781st Troop Command Battalion (JTF 781st CERFP), Marietta
 138th Chemical Company, Marietta
 1177th Transportation Company, LaGrange
 202nd Ordnance Detachment (EOD), Marietta
 248th Medical Company, Marietta
 810th Engineer Company, Swainsboro
 870th Engineer Detachment, Decatur

Air Units
165th Airlift Wing
116th Air Control Wing
117th Air Control Squadron
165th Air Support Operations Squadron
224th Joint Communications Support Squadron
283rd Combat Communications Squadron
139th Intelligence Squadron
202nd Engineering Installation Squadron
530th Air Force Band
Combat Readiness Training Center

Georgia's Adjutant General Lineage

The adjutant general is the senior military officer and de facto commander of the Georgia National Guard. Also known as TAG, they are subordinated to the governor, the chief executive. As of today, there have been 36 adjutants general in Georgia and the position has changed hands 42 times.

References

External links
Bibliography of Georgia Army National Guard History  compiled by the United States Army Center of Military History
Georgia Guard Youtube Channel
Historical Society of the Georgia National Guard
Georgia Department of Defense 2010 Annual Report

 
Military in Georgia (U.S. state)